Salvador Sulce (born 30 July 1992) is an Albanian footballer, who currently plays in the Portuguese lower leagues.

Club career

Partizani Tirana
Sulce began his professional career with Partizani Tirana at the age of 16, making his debut under the coach Shpëtim Duro.

CDR Penelense
After spending the first half of the 2010–11 season with NK Adriatic Split, he was transferred to Portugal and played with the third-tier team of CDR Penelense, making 13 appearances and scoring 5 goals. He later played once more for Partizani, having joined them in February 2012 from CDR Penelense.

References

1992 births
Living people
Sportspeople from Lushnjë
Albanian footballers
Association football forwards
FK Partizani Tirana players
FK Dinamo Tirana players
Kategoria e Parë players
Albanian expatriate footballers
Expatriate footballers in Croatia
Expatriate footballers in Portugal
Albanian expatriate sportspeople in Croatia
Albanian expatriate sportspeople in Portugal